The Catholic Church of the Holy Family is a neogothic brick church in Kaliningrad. It was built in the Haberberg city district of Königsberg, near the Pregel river, between 1904 and 1907. 

The church was designed by architect  and was built for the Catholic immigrants that were arriving in Königsberg. The church remained largely unharmed during World War II. It was used by the Red Army as a lazaret immediately after the war, and then as a fertilizer depot. 

In the beginning of the 1980s the church underwent a minor restoration, and began to function as the concert hall of the Kaliningrad Philharmonic. This made possible the installation of a new organ, which with its 44 registers and 3,600 pipes became a favourite of even the best organists of the Saint Petersburg music academy. The clock of the Kreuzkirche church was placed in the tower.

The Kaliningrad authorities have refused to return the church to the Catholic community.

References 

 Robert Albinus: Königsberg-Lexikon. Würzburg 2002, 
 Richard Armstedt: Geschichte der königl. Haupt- und Residenzstadt Königsberg in Preußen. Reprint of the original edition, Stuttgart 1899.
 Fritz Gause: Die Geschichte der Stadt Königsberg in Preußen. 3 Bände, Köln 1996, 
 Jürgen Manthey: Königsberg – Geschichte einer Weltbürgerrepublik. Hanser 2005, 
 Gunnar Strunz: Königsberg entdecken, Berlin 2006, 
 Baldur Köster: Königsberg: Architektur aus deutscher Zeit. Husum Druck, 2000, .

1904 establishments in Germany
Roman Catholic churches in Kaliningrad
Concert halls in Russia
Churches in Kaliningrad Oblast
Former churches in Königsberg
Former Roman Catholic church buildings
Gothic Revival church buildings in Russia
Holy F
Cultural heritage monuments of regional significance in Kaliningrad Oblast